Schurz may refer to:

 Schurz, Nevada, a census-designated place in Mineral County, Nevada, United States
 Mount Schurz

People with the surname
 Barbara Schurz (born 1973), artist
 Carl Schurz (1829–1906), German revolutionary and American statesman, reformer, and general
 Carl Schurz Park
 Carl Schurz High School, a public secondary school, Chicago, Illinois
 Margarethe Schurz

See also 
 Schurz Communications, American radio, television, cable TV and newspaper media group
 Schurz Communications, Incorporated v. Federal Communications Commission and United States of America
 Schurtz, spelling variation

German-language surnames